The Album is an album released in 1994 by New Zealand band, Hello Sailor.

Track listing

Hello Sailor (band) albums
1994 albums